Idiophantis thiopeda is a moth of the family Gelechiidae. It was described by Edward Meyrick in 1931. It is found on New Guinea.

References

Moths described in 1931
Idiophantis
Taxa named by Edward Meyrick